Gala is an early-ripening firm-fleshed edible potato, for which good eating and keeping qualities are claimed. It was developed by the Groß Lüsewitz-based plant breeder Norika.   In 2010, it was chosen as Thuringia's potato of the year in a public contest to which nearly 1000 consumers contributed, and in which Laura was second place.

Tuber properties
The potato has typically a roughly oval form with shallow eyes which makes it particularly suitable for mechanical peeling. Its yield per plant is relatively high, but a good water supply is vital. When cooked, the tuber suffers from only very minor discolouring. The variety has a bright yellow skin colour and a medium yellow flesh colour. It also has a very long dormancy period and it normally produced for the fresh market.

Resistances 
This variety is heat and drought resistant, as well as resistant to potato cyst nematode. It is also resistant to Pallida types 2 and 3. It has good resistance to foliar and soil-borne diseases and it also has good scab and blackleg resistance.

Planting
Planting, using chitted seed potatoes, can be done at a depth some 2 cm deeper than normal since the plants are compact and easily lifted.   To support irrigation requirements and nutritional qualities, Gala is also suitable for cultivation in relatively light soils.   A protective dressing to counter Rhizoctonia is recommended.

External links
 Amt für Ernährung, Landwirtschaft und Forsten Augsburg Fachzentrum Pflanzenbau

References 

Potato cultivars